Statistics of Swedish football Division 3 for the 2009 season.

League standings

Norra Norrland 2009

Mellersta Norrland 2009

Södra Norrland 2009

Norra Svealand 2009

Västra Svealand 2009

Södra Svealand 2009

Nordöstra Götaland 2009

Nordvästra Götaland 2009

Mellersta Götaland 2009

Sydöstra Götaland 2009

Sydvästra Götaland 2009

Södra Götaland 2009

Footnotes

References 

Swedish Football Division 3 seasons
5
Sweden
Sweden